The men's 1000 metres speed skating competition of the 2018 Winter Olympics was held on 23 February 2018 at Gangneung Oval in Gangneung on 23 February 2018.

Records
Prior to this competition, the existing world, Olympic and track records were as follows.

The following records were set during this competition.

TR = track record

Results
The races started at 19:00.

References

Men's speed skating at the 2018 Winter Olympics